The Noble Hotel, at 112 N. Noble St. in Watonga, Oklahoma, is a two-story red brick hotel which was built in 1912 and 1937.  It was listed on the National Register of Historic Places in 1996.

It was originally built to a  plan, and was doubled in size to  later.  It has been suggested that it is "Prairie Commercial" in style.

The building contains various rooms lightly themed off of various peoples' nicknames, as well as providing bed and breakfast, and hosting the local Lions club of Watonga, Oklahoma.

References

Hotels in Oklahoma
National Register of Historic Places in Blaine County, Oklahoma
Early Commercial architecture in the United States
Hotel buildings completed in 1937
1912 establishments in Oklahoma